Naila Nazir may refer to:

 Naila Nazir (flight attendant), Pakistan International Airlines flight attendant
 Naila Nazir (cricketer) (born 1989), Pakistani cricketer